Mix Markt is a German supermarket chain that operates throughout Europe that specializes in the distribution of fresh and canned foods for the Central and Eastern European cuisines. It was founded in 1997 by the three Germans from Kazakhstan Waldemar Völker, Artur Steinhauer, and Peter Schuju, who opened the first shop in Oerlinghausen, Germany.

Mix Markt is a brand of the Monolith Group, which also acts as wholesale supplier for each market, which operate as licensed partnership companies. In 2016, Mix Markt had a turnover of €345 million. As of 2020, there are a total of 345 shops in fifteen European countries.

References

External links 
 

Retail companies of Germany
Retail companies established in 1997
Food retailers
1997 establishments in Germany